The Seoul Metropolitan Office of Education (SMOE) is a school board in Seoul, South Korea. It was established on October 2, 1956.

History
The SMOE and the Gyeonggi-do Office of Education have suffered from a huge surge of teachers who voluntarily resigned in 2011 and beyond due to increased frequency of teachers' evaluation tests and difficulties of managing students.

Timeline 

 October 2, 1956 - Seoul Board of Education inaugurated (2 bureaus, 7 divisions)
 May 16, 1961 - The Board of Education dissolved
 January 13, 1962 - Education Autonomy Policy abolished. Absorbed into Seoul Metropolitan Government as Bureau of Education
 January 1, 1964 - Education Autonomy Policy and Seoul Board of Education re-established with 2 bureaus and 7 divisions
 December 30, 1972 - District offices of education established (Dongbu, Seobu, Nambu, Bukbu). The position of Vice-Superintendent and two divisions(physical Education and Administrative Finance) created (2 bureaus, 9 divisions)
 February 27, 1980 - Two district offices of education (Jungbu, Gangnam) established
 February 23, 1983 - Dongjak district office of education established
 September 3, 1987 - Two district offices of education (Gangdong, Gangseo) established
 May 26, 1991 - The Seoul Board of Education, consultative executive body, divided into two separate bodies
 September 2, 1991 - The 1st Seoul Metropolitan Board of Education commenced
 February 22, 1996 - Two district offices of education (Sungdong, Sungbuk) established
 July 1, 2009 - Office of Innovation and Welfare Support renamed to Office of Education Welfare
 January 1, 2015 - Organizational restructuring(1 Office, 3 Bureaus, 7 Divisions, 13 Divisions)

Location
The mailing address for SMOE is 2-77 Sinmunno 2-ga, Songwol-Gil 48, Jongno-gu, Seoul, Republic of Korea.

Student activism
16 years old female South Korean student, Kang Min-ji (강민진), was noticeable for publicizing a series of protests in front of the Seoul Metropolitan Office of Education for neglecting the sexual rights of South Korean teenagers.

See also
Education in South Korea

References

External links
  Seoul Metropolitan Office of Education

1956 establishments in South Korea
Education in South Korea
Educational organizations based in South Korea
Education in Seoul